Waterman is a surname. Notable people with the surname include:

Alan T. Waterman (1892–1967), American physicist
Alma May Waterman (1893–1977), American botanist
Boy Waterman (born 1984), Dutch footballer
Carol Lee Scott (1942–2017), whose real name was Carol Waterman, British actress
Cecilio Waterman (born 1991), Panamanian footballer
Dennis Waterman (1948–2022), British actor
Don Waterman (born 1950), former NASCAR Cup Series driver
Clyde Waterman (fl. early/mid 20th C), manager of Ozone Theatres, Australian cinema chain, son of Hugh and brother of Ewen
Sir Ewen McIntyre Waterman (1901–1982), Australian businessman in the cinema and wool industries, son of Hugh and brother of Clyde
Fanny Waterman (1920-2020), British pianist and piano teacher
Hannah Waterman (born 1975), British actress
Hazel Wood Waterman (1865–1948), American architect
Hugh Waterman (fl. early 20th C), Australian cinema entrepreneur, owner of Ozone Theatres, father of Clyde and Ewen
Joel Waterman (born 1996), Canadian soccer player
John Waterman (born 1952), American politician
Leroy Waterman (1875–1972), American language professor, archaeologist and biblical scholar
Lewis Waterman (1837–1901), American inventor and businessman
Louise Waterman, maiden name of Louise Waterman Wise (1874–1947), American social worker and artist
Michael Waterman (born 1942), American computational biologist
Nixon Waterman (1859–1944), American poet and newspaper writer
Pete Waterman (born 1947), English record producer, songwriter and businessman
Robert Waterman (governor) (1826–1891), American politician
Robert Waterman (sea captain) (1808–1884), American merchant sea captain
Robert H. Waterman Jr., American author and consultant
Ron Waterman (born 1965), an American mixed martial artist and professional wrestler
Sterry R. Waterman (1901-1984), American judge
Steve Waterman (disambiguation), multiple people
Thomas G. Waterman (1788–1862), American politician
Waldo Waterman (1894–1976), American inventor and aviation pioneer

Occupational surnames